Sakina is a feminine given name of Arabic origin.

List of people with the given name 

 Sakina Aliyeva (1925–2010), Azerbaijani-Soviet stateswoman and politician
 Sakina Jaffrey (born 1962), American actress
 Sakina Karchaoui (born 1996), French professional footballer
 Sakina Sheikh, British politician

See also 

 Sarina (given name)
 Sabrina (given name)

Arabic feminine given names